The 2015–16 Marist Red Foxes women's basketball team represented Marist College during the 2015–16 NCAA Division I men's basketball season. The Red Foxes, led by fourteenth year head coach Brian Giorgis, play their home games at the McCann Arena and were members of the Metro Atlantic Athletic Conference. They finished the season 16–16, 14–6 in MAAC play to finish in third place. They advanced to the semifinals of the MAAC women's tournament where they lost to Iona.

Roster

Schedule

|-
!colspan=9 style="background:#E51837; color:#FFFFFF;"| Regular season

|-
!colspan=9 style="background:#E51837; color:#FFFFFF;"| MAAC Women's Tournament

See also
 2015–16 Marist Red Foxes men's basketball team

References

Marist Red Foxes women's basketball seasons
Marist